Delhaize Group SA was a Belgian multinational retail company headquartered in Molenbeek-Saint-Jean, Brussels, Belgium, and operated in seven countries and on three continents. The principal activity of Delhaize Group was the operation of food supermarkets. On 24 June 2015, Delhaize reached an agreement with Ahold to merge and form a new parent/holding company headquartered in the Netherlands: Ahold Delhaize.

History
Delhaize was founded near Charleroi, Belgium, in 1867 by Jules Delhaize and his brothers Auguste, Edouard and Adolphe. He was helped in this endeavor by his future brother-in-law, Jules Vieujant. For their new shop, they chose the lion, the symbol of strength, as their logo. They also chose a motto: unity is strength.

In 2005, Delhaize Group completed the acquisition of the Belgian supermarket chain Cash Fresh for 118.6 million euros. Delhaize paid an additional 51 million euros to acquire real estate assets of Cash Fresh.

As of 31 December 2014, Delhaize Group had a sales network (which includes directly operated, franchised, and affiliated stores) of 3,402 stores and employed approximately 150,000 people (excluding the stores and related associates of divested and discontinued operations). Store formats are primarily supermarkets, which represent 85% of Delhaize Group's sales network. Delhaize Group's sales network also includes other store formats such as neighborhood stores, convenience stores, and specialty stores. The company is actively engaged with the U.S. Environmental Protection Agency's Energy Star program to manage energy efficiency across its U.S. facilities.

In addition to food retailing, Delhaize Group engages in food wholesaling to stores in its sales network and in nonfood retailing of products such as pet products and health and beauty products.

In 2014, Delhaize Group recorded revenue of €21.4 billion and underlying operating profit of €762 million. Delhaize Group's operations are located primarily in the United States (Food Lion LLC, Hannaford Brothers Company) and Belgium. Other operations are located in Greece, Indonesia, Serbia, Luxembourg and Romania.

Delhaize entered the U.S. market through its acquisition of Food Town Stores in 1983, renaming it Food Lion due to name conflict with other stores, and expanding from 22 stores to 226. In 1985, it became a franchisee for Cub Foods and opened the first of many stores in the Atlanta area and in 1996, acquired Kash n' Karry, a Florida grocery chain. Both its Cub Foods stores, and the Kash n' Karry chain have since been sold by Delhaize.

In 2007, the company left the Czech market after 16 years and sold all of its 97 supermarkets to Billa. On January 19, 2009, Delhaize announced on request that the branches in Aachen and Cologne should be sold. In 2009, the company left the German market after 6 years and sold all of its 4 supermarkets to REWE Group. In 2011, Delhaize acquired Serbian retailer Delta Maxi.

In May 2013, Harveys was sold along with sister supermarket chains Sweetbay and Reid's to BI-LO, LLC for $265 million.

The locations in Montenegro were sold in 2013. The locations in Bosnia and Herzegovina were sold in 2014.

In November 2014, Delhaize Group signed an agreement to sell its Bottom Dollar food store locations in the U.S. to Aldi, Inc. The stores were closed on 12 January 2015, and the transaction was completed early 2015.

On 24 June 2015, Delhaize reached an agreement with Ahold to merge, forming a new parent company, Ahold Delhaize. The merger agreement was signed after approval by shareholders and competition authorities on July 23, 2016. Ahold CEO Dick Boer became CEO of the merged company until his retirement in July 2018, with Frans Muller, CEO of Delhaize initially as deputy CEO and chief integration officer under supervision of Dick Boer. Frans Muller succeeded as CEO in July 2018.

Sales divisions

Europe
Belgium
 Delhaize
 AD Delhaize
 Proxy Delhaize
 Shop & Go
 Delhaize.be
 Caddyhome.be
 Delhaizewineworld.com

Czech Republic
 Delvita (1991–2007)

Luxembourg
 Delhaize
 Proxy Delhaize

Greece
 Alfa-Beta Vassilopoulos
 City AB
 AB Shop & Go
 AB Food Market
 ENA

Romania
 Mega Image
 Shop & Go

Serbia
 Maxi
 Shop & Go (formerly: Mini Maxi)
 Tempo Centar (formerly: Tempo Cash & Carry)
 Mega Maxi

North America
United States

Operated as Delhaize America, a wholly owned subsidiary of Delhaize Group:
 Food Lion
 Hannaford
 Bottom Dollar Food

Asia
Indonesia
 Super Indo (51%)

See also
 European Retail Round Table

References

External links

 

Ahold Delhaize
1867 establishments in Belgium
Retail companies established in 1867
Companies established in 1867
1867 establishments
2016 disestablishments in Belgium
Retail companies disestablished in 2016
2016 mergers and acquisitions
Companies formerly listed on the New York Stock Exchange
Companies listed on the New York Stock Exchange
Companies based in Brussels
Convenience stores
Supermarkets of Belgium
Companies of Belgium
Supermarkets of the United States
Supermarkets
Belgian brands
Publicly traded companies
Food retailers
Wholesalers